Why Bring That Up? is a 1929 American pre-Code musical film directed by George Abbott and starring minstrel show comedians Charles Mack and George Moran, as blackface team Two Black Crows.

The film's title was part of the "vernacular of the day". It was the duo's first talking comedy film.

Plot
George's partner in vaudeville quits their act, claiming that Betty has broken his heart. George then teams up with Charlie, a stranded trouper, and Irving becomes their manager. Later, in New York, the "Two Black Crows" star in their own revue and save money to build their own theater on Broadway. Betty comes to the theater with her lover, who poses as a cousin and induces George to hire her. He showers her with jewels and money. She tries to persuade George to invest in oil stock her lover is selling, and though their act is a success, Charlie fires Betty. When Charlie and Betty's lover quarrel, Charlie is injured.

Cast
Charles Mack as Mack
George Moran as Moran
Evelyn Brent as Betty
Harry Green as Irving
Bert Swor as Bert
Freeman Wood as Powell
Lawrence Leslie as Casey
Helen Lynch as Marie
Selmer Jackson as Eddie
Jack Luden as Treasurer
Monte Collins as Skeets (as Monte Collins Jr.)
Eddie Kane as Manager
Charlie Hall as Tough (as Charles Hall)

Soundtrack
 Do I Know What I'm Doing While I'm in Love, written by Leo Robin, Richard A. Whiting (as Richard Whiting) and Sam Coslow
 Shoo Shoo Boogie Boo, performed by Ethel Waters, written by Leo Robin, Richard A. Whiting (as Richard Whiting) and Sam Coslow

Reception
Toronto Daily Star deemed the film a "success".

References

External links

Why Bring That Up? at Answers.com
Review and Information at VITAPHONE VARIETIES

1929 films
1929 musical films
1920s English-language films
Films directed by George Abbott
American black-and-white films
American musical films
Blackface minstrel shows and films
1920s American films